The 2017 Hollywood Casino 400 is a Monster Energy NASCAR Cup Series race that was held on October 22, 2017, at Kansas Speedway in Kansas City, Kansas. Contested over 267 laps on the 1.5 mile (2.4 km) intermediate speedway, it was the 32nd race of the 2017 Monster Energy NASCAR Cup Series season, sixth race of the Playoffs, and final race of the Round of 12. Martin Truex Jr. of Furniture Row Racing, won the race.

Report

Background

Kansas Speedway is a  tri-oval race track in Kansas City, Kansas. It was built in 2001 and it currently hosts two annual NASCAR race weekends. The Verizon IndyCar Series also raced at here until 2011. The speedway is owned and operated by the International Speedway Corporation.

Entry list

First practice

Qualifying

Qualifying results

Ryan Blaney started last after failing post-qualifying inspection.

Practice (post-qualifying)

Second practice

Final practice

Race

Stage 1

Start 
Martin Truex Jr. led the field to the green flag at 3:16 p.m., He led a total of 34 laps, The first caution of the race flew for a competition caution on lap 32.

The race restarted on lap 36 following a competition caution at 30 laps, pole-sitter and race leader Martin Truex Jr. was penalized for a restart violation —  going inside the white line — and was sent to the back of the field. It appeared Kevin Harvick who was running second, also dipped inside the line behind Truex but was not penalized because he wasn't in the front row. The second caution of the race flew on lap 48 when Brett Moffitt spun out in turn 2, Kurt Busch won the free pass under caution.  Brad Keselowski, Ryan Blaney, Dale Earnhardt Jr., Ryan Newman, Chris Buescher and Truex stayed out while everyone else pitted.

The race restarted on lap 52, Kyle Larson who entered the race third in the standings and 29 points ahead of the cutoff line, pulled into pit road with a blown engine on lap 66 and fell to 37th place during the first stage, crippling his chance to advance to the third round. Larson won four races this season, tied for second-most in the series.

The third caution of the race flew on lap 78 for fluid on the track, Matt DiBenedetto won the free pass under caution, Kyle Busch, who entered the race ninth in the standings and seven points below the cutoff line to advance to the Round of 8, picked up 10 valuable points by winning the first stage. Busch led 39 laps for his 14th stage win of the season. Contending playoff drivers constituted the top nine finishers in the stage. Behind Busch were Kevin Harvick, Blaney, Matt Kenseth, Denny Hamlin, Jimmie Johnson, Chase Elliott, Jamie McMurray and Martin Truex Jr., Kasey Kahne was 10th.

Stage 2 
The race restarted on lap 87 and it remained green for 70 laps, The fourth caution of the race flew on 157 when Brett Moffitt again spun in turn 2, Aric Almirola won the free pass under caution.

The race restarted on lap 160.

Denny Hamlin, who began the race in fifth place, 21 points ahead of the cutoff line, won the second stage and picked up 10 valuable playoff points. He was followed by Kevin Harvick, Brad Keselowski, Matt Kenseth, Kyle Busch, non-playoff driver Erik Jones, Jamie McMurray, Ryan Blaney, Chase Elliott and Jimmie Johnson. Keselowski, who is already assured of advancing to the Round of 8 after winning at Talladega last week, and Hamlin was penalized for speeding through pit road and sent to the back of the field. The fifth caution of the race flew on lap 162 for the end of stage two.

Final stage 

The race restarted on lap 167 and it remained green for nine laps, The sixth caution of the race flew for a single-car spin in turn 3, Ricky Stenhouse Jr.  who was 11th in the standings and 22 points behind the cutoff line, cut a tire on lap 174 and hit the wall. Stenhouse was in a must-win situation to advance to the third round.

The race restarted on lap 180.

The seventh caution of the race flew when defending champion Jimmie Johnson, on the edge to reach the Round of 8, spun out on lap 189, putting his chances to advance in peril. Johnson lost control of his car, his right quarterpanel struck the wall and he went spinning across the infield grass before going to pit road for repairs.

The race restarted on lap 193, Jimmie Johnson lost control and hit the wall again and slid down the race track in a plume of smoke, bringing out the race's eighth caution.

The race restarted on lap 197 and the ninth caution of the race flew for a multi-car wreck on the backstretch involving 13 cars, Matt Kenseth was disqualified from the race, Kenseth was disqualified from the race  when his team was penalized for having more than six crew members over the wall while on the caution clock. Kenseth, the 2003 series champion, was in contention to advance to the third round, A total of 13 cars was collected were Matt Kenseth, Jamie McMurray, Erik Jones, Joey Logano, Ryan Newman, Clint Bowyer, Aric Almirola, Daniel Suárez, Trevor Bayne, Chase Elliott, Austin Dillon, Brad Keselowski, Dale Earnhardt Jr., and Danica Patrick, The red flag was displayed for 10 minutes and 10 seconds to facilitate cleanup on the track.

The race restarted on lap 205 and it remained green for 32 laps, The tenth caution of the race flew on lap 237 when A. J. Allmendinger spun out in turn 4, Trevor Bayne won the free pass under caution

The race restarted on lap 243, Martin Truex Jr. was already safely into the Round of 8 of the 2017 playoffs, but his car was better than everyone else Sunday. Truex overcame a restart penalty early in the race and the death of one of his crew members on Saturday to win the second-round elimination race. Truex became the first driver to sweep both Kansas races since they began running twice at the track in 2011. The victory was the fourth in a row for Truex on a mile-and-a-half track and his seventh overall this season.

Post race 
"I can't say enough about all these guys on this Furniture Row (team). Really proud of them," Truex said. "We raced with a heavy heart today after losing Jim (Watson) last night. Want to send condolences to the family. He was a heck of a guy and a great worker.

"Excited to get another one here this week. It's really Furniture Row's home track. We got the one in the spring after so many heartbreaks, and it didn't look like it was going to happen today but we just persevered.Martin Truex Jr scores his 7th win of 2017 with Jamie Mcmurray, Kyle Larson, Ricky Stenhouse Jr and Matt Kenseth all being elnimated from the playoffs.

Race results

Stage results

Stage 1
Laps: 80

Stage 2
Laps: 80

Final stage results

Stage 3
Laps: 107

Race statistics
 Lead changes: 7 among different drivers
 Cautions/Laps: 10 for 49
 Red flags: 1 for 10 minutes and 10 seconds
 Time of race: 3 hours, 11 minutes, 57 seconds
 Average speed:

Media

Television
NBC Sports covered the race on the television side. Rick Allen, Jeff Burton and Steve Letarte had the call in the booth for the race. Dave Burns, Parker Kligerman, Marty Snider and Kelli Stavast reported from pit lane during the race.

Radio
MRN had the radio call for the race, which was simulcast on Sirius XM NASCAR Radio.

Standings after the race

Drivers' Championship standings

Manufacturers' Championship standings

Note: Only the first 16 positions are included for the driver standings.

References

2017 in sports in Kansas
Hollywood Casino 400
NASCAR races at Kansas Speedway
Hollywood Casino 400